Craig Maxwell Farrell (born 28 January 1964) is an Australian politician, and a member of the Tasmanian Legislative Council representing the seat of Derwent for the Labor Party.

In the 1980s, Farrell hosted The Cartoon Company, a Saturday morning cartoon programming block on TasTV, with a costumed character called "Boss Poss". From the 1990s, he was a television sales executive and real estate representative.

Farrell was elected to the Legislative Council in a by-election on 7 May 2011 following the resignation of Michael Aird in 2010. He also served as a councillor and Deputy Mayor of Derwent Valley Council until October 2011, and was an electoral officer in the New Norfolk office of federal MP Dick Adams. In February 2012 he stood down as president of the Derwent Valley Railway Preservation Society but remained on the board.

On his first day in Parliament, Farrell was appointed Deputy Leader of Government Business in the Upper House. A year later, he was appointed Leader of Government Business in the Upper House on the retirement of the incumbent, Doug Parkinson.

On 21 May 2019, Farrell was elected as president of the Legislative Council, following the retirement of the incumbent, Jim Wilkinson.

In 2021, Farrell was elected for a further six-year term as the Member for Derwent.

References

External links
Official website

1964 births
Living people
Members of the Tasmanian Legislative Council
Presidents of the Tasmanian Legislative Council
Australian television presenters
Australian Labor Party members of the Parliament of Tasmania
21st-century Australian politicians